Puya glareosa is a species in the genus Puya. This species is endemic to Bolivia.

References

glareosa
Flora of Bolivia